Hernán Enrique Jansen Brito (born 6 March 1985 in Caracas) is a Venezuelan fencer. At the 2012 Summer Olympics, he competed in the Men's sabre, but was defeated in the second round.

Notes

References

External links
 

1985 births
Living people
Venezuelan male sabre fencers
Olympic fencers of Venezuela
Fencers at the 2012 Summer Olympics
Sportspeople from Caracas
Pan American Games bronze medalists for Venezuela
Pan American Games medalists in fencing
Fencers at the 2011 Pan American Games
Central American and Caribbean Games silver medalists for Venezuela
Competitors at the 2006 Central American and Caribbean Games
Central American and Caribbean Games medalists in fencing
Medalists at the 2011 Pan American Games
21st-century Venezuelan people